Oscar Augustus Constantine Lund (May 21, 1885 – May 2, 1963) was a Swedish-born silent film actor, screenwriter and director of the American and Swedish motion picture industry.

Biography
Oscar A. C. Lund was born May 21, 1885 in Gothenburg, Sweden, the son of Swedish actor and theater director Carl Ludvig Lund (1858–1893). He emigrated in 1900 to the United States. Lund joined the burgeoning motion picture industry, directing his first film in 1912 titled The Wager. The following year, Lund filmed The Great Unknown in Canada .

Lund also wrote the screenplay as well as acted in many of the films he directed. In 1917 he wrote  Mother Love and the Law based on a real life child-custody case in Illinois.

Between 1912 and 1924, Lund directed more than 60 films in the United States. These included the first feature film made by the New Jersey based U.S. division of the French Éclair Film Company in 1914 titled Into the Wilderness. He was a director and writer  for Together (1918),  The Nature Girl (1918) and Peg of the Pirates (1918). He frequently worked with director and screenwriter B. A. Rolfe (1879–1956) and with the British actress Barbara Tennant (1892–1982), directing her in more than half a dozen films.

Lund returned to Sweden in 1931, and to filmmaking, directing his first and only talkie, a Swedish language film titled Kärlek och dynamit (1933).

Lund died May 2, 1963 and was interred in the Skogskyrkogården in Stockholm.

Selected filmography
Lady Babbie (1913)
The Sons of a Soldier (1913)
Her New York (1917)
For Woman's Favor (1924)
 Kärlek och dynamit (Love and Dynamite) (1933)

References

External links

Oscar A. C. Lund at the Film Database Search

1885 births
1963 deaths
Swedish film directors
American film directors

Swedish male screenwriters
Swedish male actors
Swedish emigrants to the United States
Burials at Skogskyrkogården
20th-century Swedish screenwriters
20th-century Swedish male writers